Le Mirador Resort & Spa, previously Le Mirador Kempinski, is a former nursing home which was built in 1904. It is located in Chardonne, Vaud at Le Mont-Pèlerin in Switzerland.

The building was originally a purpose built nursing home called Mon Repos which was built in 1904 by the Société de l'Ermitage. The architect was J.-H. Collombet who endeavoured to avoid the coldness of the architecture of many contemporary clinics.

In 1934 the French composer, Maurice Ravel stayed at the nursing home following an accidental injury.

References

Nursing homes
Buildings and structures in the canton of Vaud